Senecio venosus is a species of Senecio in the family Asteraceae. It is endemic to South Africa, Botswana, and Zimbabwe.

References 

venosus

Flora of South Africa
Flora of Botswana
Flora of Zimbabwe